Suruga Bay (駿河湾, Suruga-wan) is a bay on the Pacific coast of Honshū in Shizuoka Prefecture, Japan. It is situated north of a straight line from Omaezaki Point to Irōzaki Point at the tip of the Izu Peninsula and surrounded by Honshū to the southwest and west and the Izu Peninsula to the east.

Geology

Suruga Bay is a place of contrasts. Numerous rivers—especially the major Fuji, the Ōi, and Abe rivers—empty into its western portion, giving that area of the bay a seabed rich in submarine canyons and other geographical features, whereas at the bay's easternmost end, only the Kano River empties into a pocket called Uchiura-wan at Numazu, Shizuoka, where the Izu Peninsula connects to Honshu, giving the water greater transparency and leaving the seabed largely flat except for a number of small rocky islands, some joined to the mainland by tombolos. This seabed variety coincides with coastline differences as well: The western and central sections of the Suruga Bay coastline, roughly from Shizuoka to Numazu, are characterized by sandy beaches such as those at Yuigahama and Tagonoura, whereas the eastern and northeastern stretches from Numazu down the southwestern coast of the Izu Peninsula to Irōzaki, are generally rocky.The bay is open to the Philippine Sea/Pacific Ocean to the south, but is mostly protected from oceanic waves by Izu Peninsula. This, coupled with the seabed and water characteristics mentioned above, results in conditions favorable to fishing, sailing, windsurfing, swimming
and research on deep-sea organisms.  An undersea plateau at the bay's southwest end, known as Senoumi, is especially well known as a rich fishing ground. 

Suruga Bay was formed by tectonic subduction of the Philippine Sea Plate and the Eurasian Plate at the Suruga Trough, making it a source of considerable seismic activity, and giving the bay its extreme depth.

Environmental pollution 
Ever since the post-war industrial boom of Japan, the bay has suffered from severe industrial pollution. By 1970, local paper mills produced so much that the small city of Fuji (1970 pop. 180,000) produced  of waste water every day – equivalent to the daily sewage of Tokyo at the time (1970 pop. 9 million). The sulphur-laden sludge was so thick that it threatened to block the harbour, requiring dredging that severely damaged the marine life. Protests from local citizens and fishermen in the area put pressure on the government to take action. Despite subsequent regulations, surveys of local sea life in the mid-2010s continue to show intense PCB and PBDE contamination.

The pollution of Suruga Bay became so infamous that it featured in the 1971 film Godzilla vs. Hedorah. The name of the titular monster is derived from hedoro, the Japanese word for 'mud', and the creature fed off heavy pollution in the bay.

Transport
Suruga Bay can be reached by car from Tokyo via Numazu in two to five hours depending on traffic conditions on the Tōmei Expressway or in Numazu.

References

External links 

Bays of Japan
Landforms of Shizuoka Prefecture